Artūras is a Lithuanian masculine given name. It is a cognate of the English language name Arthur. Notable people with the name include:

Artūras Barysas (1954–2005), Lithuanian "counter-culture" actor, singer, photographer, and filmmaker
Artūras Jomantas (born 1985), Lithuanian basketball player
Artūras Karnišovas (born 1971), retired Lithuanian professional basketball player
Artūras Kasputis (born 1967), retired track and road cyclist from Lithuania
Artūras Paulauskas (born 1953), Lithuanian politician
Artūras Rimkevičius (born 1983), Lithuanian footballer
Artūras Skučas (born 1961), writer and military man of Lithuania
Arturas Veta, Soviet sprint canoeist
Artūras Zuokas (born 1968), Lithuanian journalist, businessman, leader of the Liberal and Centre Union political party

Lithuanian masculine given names